Thanh Thịnh  is a commune (xã) and village in Chợ Mới District, Bắc Kạn Province, in Vietnam.

The commune was formed by the consolidation of the two former communes of Thanh Bình and Nông Thịnh.

Populated places in Bắc Kạn province
Communes of Bắc Kạn province